"Hearts of Stone" is an American R&B song. It became a #1 hit on two of  the Billboard three lists, Best Sellers in Stores and Most Played in Jukeboxes in 1955 for The Fontane Sisters. It was written by Eddie Ray and Rudy Jackson, members of the San Bernardino, California-based rhythm and blues vocal group the Jewels (no relation to the female group The Jewels from Washington, DC) which first recorded it for the R&B label in 1954. The Jewels began as a gospel group, then became the Marbles, recording for the Lucky label out of Los Angeles. According to Johnny Torrence, leader of the Marbles/Jewels, it was taken from a song they recorded in their gospel days.  

"Hearts of Stone" was covered and taken to the charts in 1954 by East Coast R&B vocal group the Charms, causing the story of the Jewels' involvement to be ignored by various writers and DJs who assume the Charms' cover was the original.  The Charms' version of the song went to number one on the R&B Best Sellers and number fifteen on the pop charts.

A different song, also with the name "Hearts of Stone", was written by Bruce Springsteen and recorded during the Darkness on the Edge of Town sessions (appears on the anthology box set Tracks).  It was recorded and released by Southside Johnny and the Asbury Jukes on their 1978 album Hearts of Stone.

Other recordings
It also has been recorded by:
A 1953/54 version by Eddie Cochran was released in 1997 on the album Rockin' It Country Style.
Red Foley on the Decca label in 1954
The Fontane Sisters on Dot Records in (1954) - the biggest hit version, reaching #1 on the chart in 1955
Elvis Presley (1955) - live on the Louisiana Hayride radio show.
In Italy sung and recorded with the title BABY BU (Italian lyrics by Larici) by Carla Boni-Gino Latilla-Quartetto Armonia. Orchestra director: Angelini in the year 1956.
Anita, June, Helen and Mother Maybelle Carter performed a memorable live version of this song on an appearance filmed in color by Albert Gannaway in Nashville in the mid-1950s. Red Foley opened both the first and last programs of Ozark Jubilee with the song.
Tommy Sands on his 1958 Capitol album Sands Storm
Johnny Preston on his 1960 album Running Bear.
Bill Black's Combo (1961)
John Fogerty and The Blue Ridge Rangers (1973)- this version went to #37 on the Hot 100.
NRBQ in 1972 on their album Workshop
Don Walser and Mandy Barnett (1998)
Ray Stevens in 2015 on his album Here We Go Again!

References

External links
Billboard: Top Rock'n'Roll Hits, 1955

1954 songs
1955 singles
Number-one singles in the United States
Eddie Cochran songs
Red Foley songs
The Fontane Sisters songs
Johnny Preston songs
John Fogerty songs